Hip-Hop: A Cultural Odyssey is a coffee-table book published by Aria Multimedia Entertainment. It is a 420-page book about hip hop that showcases the roots, birth, evolution, and global impact of hip hop culture over the past four decades.

Content
The book consists of 30 original essays on the evolution of hip hop culture, 40 individual profiles of artists, from Kurtis Blow to will.i.am, playlists of the singles and albums essential to each of hip hop's past four decades, and 154 interviews with DJs, MCs, producers, graffiti writers, B-boys, and B-girls of the culture. The photography in the book includes 20x24 Polaroid portraits captured by Jonathan Mannion, as well as images contributed by key eyewitnesses of the culture. 

Featured artists within the book include Jay-Z, Kanye West, Eminem, Run-DMC, Outkast, Queen Latifah, will.i.am, Sean Combs, 50 Cent, Will Smith, Missy Elliott, Native Tongues, LL Cool J, Public Enemy, 2Pac, The Notorious B.I.G., etc. Says Cee-Lo Green of the book, “It’s our take on our own history and what our contribution to the culture has been.”

Critical reception
Critical reception of Hip Hop: A Cultural Odyssey was positive, with The Source calling it an essential literary and photographic collective of Hip-Hop's essence.

References

External links 
 http://hiphopculturebook.com/
 https://twitter.com/HHCObook
 http://www.facebook.com/HipHopACulturalOdyssey

Hip hop books